The Kuwait Investment Authority (KIA) is the Middle East's oldest sovereign wealth fund, managing the state’s reserve and the state’s future generation fund (FGF). 

Founded in 1953, the KIA is the world's oldest sovereign wealth fund. As of April 2022, it was the world's 3rd largest sovereign wealth fund with US$738 billion in assets under management.

History and profile
KIA was founded on 23 February 1953 to manage the funds of the Kuwaiti Government in light of financial surpluses after the discovery of oil

KIA manages the Kuwait General Reserve Fund, the Kuwait Future Generations Fund, as well as any other assets committed by the Ministry of Finance. To put KIA's size into perspective, the Kuwait Future Generations Fund has 15% of annual oil revenues added to it.

KIA's board of directors is headed by the minister of finance with other seats allocated to the Energy Minister, Governor of the Central Bank of Kuwait, Undersecretary of the Ministry of Finance, and 5 other nationals who are experts in the field, 3 of which should not hold any other public office.

The Chinese regulator awarded Kuwait Investment Authority an additional $700 million quota on top of $300 million awarded in March 2012. The quota is the highest to be granted by China to foreign investment entities.

The Kuwait Investment Authority has an infrastructure arm and signed an agreement to acquire the oil and gas pipeline firm North Sea Midstream Partners Limited for approximately 1.3 billion GBP in 2018.

Grupo Torras
In 1986, the KIA's London based subsidiary, the Kuwait Investment Office (KIO), bought control of Torras Hostench, a Spanish paper maker. Torras subsequently took over a number of other companies to become Grupo Torras in June 1988. KIO invested about $2.5 billion in building up the company and another $1.8 billion to shore it up after the end of Spain's 1980s economic boom and the annexation of Kuwait by Iraq. However, in December 1992 Grupo Torras entered receivership among accusations of fraud, and Kuwait's investment was a total loss. One of its projects was the Gate of Europe twin towers in Madrid, which was still incomplete when the company collapsed.

See also
Economy of Kuwait

References

External links 

Kuwait Investment Authority
Kuwait Ministry of Finance
KIA SWFI Profile

1953 establishments in Kuwait
Government agencies established in 1953
Organizations based in Kuwait
Sovereign wealth funds
Economy of Kuwait